The Ben Nevis Race is a mountain race that takes place annually, from the foot of Ben Nevis (the highest mountain in the British Isles) to the top, then back again. The course is 14km long and includes around 1,340metres of ascent. Up to six hundred people may compete in the event.

History

The first timed event on Ben Nevis was in 1895. William Swan, a barber from Fort William, made the first recorded timed ascent up the mountain on or around 27 September of that year, when he ran from the old post office in Fort William to the summit and back in 2 hours 41 minutes. The following years saw several improvements on Swan's record, but the first competitive race was held on 3 June 1898 under Scottish Amateur Athletic Association rules. Ten competitors ran the course, which started at the Lochiel Arms Hotel in Banavie and was thus longer than the route from Fort William; the winner was 21-year-old Hugh Kennedy, a gamekeeper at Tor Castle, who finished (coincidentally with Swan's original run) in 2hours 41minutes.

Regular races were organised until 1903, when two events were held; these were the last for 24years, perhaps due to the closure of the summit observatory the following year. The first was from Achintee, at the foot of the Pony Track, and finished at the summit; It was won in just over an hour by Ewen MacKenzie, the observatory roadman. The second race ran from new Fort William post office, and MacKenzie lowered the record to 2hours 10minutes, a record he held for 34years.

The Ben Nevis Race has been run in its current form since 1937. It now takes place on the first Saturday in September every year.

In 1955, Kathleen Connochie, was the first woman to finish the course.

Rules
Due to the seriousness of the mountain environment, entry is restricted to those who have completed three category A hill races, and runners must carry waterproofs, a hat, gloves and a whistle; anyone who has not reached the summit after two hours is turned back.

In 2014 only 600competitors were allowed to take part, with the limit being set for safety reasons.

In 2016, competitors were asked to stay off the area known as the Grassy Bank, after Scottish Natural Heritage contacted race organisers with concerns about erosion in that area.

Results
Fort William taxi driver Eddie Campbell won the race three times, the first in 1952.

The men's course record was set in 1984, when Kenny Stuart of Keswick Athletic Club won the race with a time of 1:25:34. The women's record is 1:43:01, set by Victoria Wilkinson in 2018.

 there are one hundred people who have completed at least 21 of the races, each of these athletes has been presented with a Connochie Silver Plaque.

In 2019, Finlay Wild won the race for a tenth consecutive year.

The winners of the race have been as follows.

References

External links

Mountain running competitions
Fell running competitions
Sports competitions in Scotland
Recurring sporting events established in 1895
1895 establishments in Scotland
Skyrunning competitions
Skyrunner World Series
Ben Nevis